FTT may refer to:

 Failure to thrive
 Fair Tax Town, a Welsh political movement
 False tagging theory
 Financial transaction tax
 Free Territory of Trieste
 Funky Tekno Tribe, an American music promoter
 Fuzzy-trace theory
First-tier Tribunal
FTT, code of the cryptocurrency exchange FTXs' exchange token